Tudge is a surname. Notable people with the surname include:

Colin Tudge (born 1943), British science writer and broadcaster
Alan Tudge (born 1971), Australian politician
Kyle Tudge (born 1987), Welsh cricketer
Natalia Tudge (born 1986), Canadian film and television producer